Monkstown may refer to:

Locations
Monkstown, County Antrim, a small village in County Antrim, Northern Ireland
Monkstown, County Cork, a town in County Cork
Monkstown, County Dublin, a suburb near Dun Laoghaire on the outskirts of Dublin city in County Dublin
Monkstown, County Westmeath, a townland in Taghmon civil parish
Monkstown, Newfoundland and Labrador, a municipality
Monkstown Community School, a school in County Antrim

Transportation
Monkstown railway station (County Cork), a former railway station in Monkstown, County Cork, Ireland
Monkstown railway station (Northern Ireland), a former station in Monkstown, County Antrim, Northern Ireland
Salthill and Monkstown railway station, in Monkstown, County Dublin, Ireland